Rockport is an unincorporated community in Penn Township, Parke County, in the U.S. state of Indiana.

History
The community's name alludes to the rock cliffs over a local mill.

Geography

References

Unincorporated communities in Parke County, Indiana
Unincorporated communities in Indiana